HSMK may refer to:
Humayun Saqib Muazzam Khan
Rumbek Airport's ICAO code